Lieutenant General Khushdil Khan Afridi served as the Governor of Balochistan, Pakistan from 18 November 1984 to 30 December 1985 during General Zia ul Haq's martial law administration. Afridi was the last military governor of Balochistan province.

After retiring from gubernatorial service, he became the first commander of the XII Corps, which he led until May 1987.

References

Pakistani generals
Pakistani politicians
Pashtun people
Governors of Balochistan, Pakistan